Daniel Dolejš (born 4 July 1994) is a Czech professional ice hockey goaltender. He currently plays with HC Vítkovice Steel of the Czech Extraliga.

Dolejš made his Czech Extraliga debut playing with HC Vítkovice Steel during the 2013–14 Czech Extraliga season.

References

External links

1994 births
Living people
Czech ice hockey goaltenders
HC Vítkovice players
People from Humpolec
Sportspeople from the Vysočina Region